Hypocalymma myrtifolium is a member of the family Myrtaceae endemic to Western Australia.

It blooms between July and November producing cream-white flowers.

It is found in a small area on steep rocky slopes in the Great southern region of Western Australia centred around Gnowangerup where it grows in peaty-sandy soils over quartzite.

References

myrtifolium
Endemic flora of Western Australia
Rosids of Western Australia
Endangered flora of Australia
Plants described in 1852
Taxa named by Nikolai Turczaninow